The Young Communist League of Czechoslovakia, nicknamed Komsomol, was a youth organization in Czechoslovakia, active between 1921 and 1936. The organization was the youth wing of the Communist Party of Czechoslovakia. The organization was the Czechoslovak section of the Young Communist International.

In October 1920 the majority of the Czechoslovak Social Democratic Youth voted to approve the twenty-one conditions of the Communist International and to join the Young Communist International. The Young Communist League of Czechoslovakia was founded on February 20, 1921, through the merger of Czech, Slovak and German youth groups. The membership fluctuated between 8,000 and 13,000, later reaching a peak of about 24,000 members in the 1930s. In 1922 a pioneer movement was started as a subsection of the Young Communist League.

Jan Šverma, K. Aksamit, Emil Hršel, O. Synkové, V. Synkové, J. Zika, J. Černý and M. Krásný were leading figures in the Young Communist League. The organization issued several publications, such as Mladý komunista, Komunistická mládež, Pravda mládeže and Mladá garda.

The organization was dissolved in 1936, being substituted by different ethnic youth organizations; the Youth League (Czech), the Slovak Youth League, the German Youth and the Hungarian Youth League.

References

1921 establishments in Czechoslovakia
1936 disestablishments in Czechoslovakia
Youth wings of communist parties
Youth wings of political parties in Czechoslovakia
Youth organizations established in 1921
Organizations disestablished in 1936